Catacombs is the fourth full-length album by Cass McCombs released on June 1, 2009 in the UK, and on July 7 in North America via Domino Records. The first single, "Dreams Come True Girl", was released on May 25, 2009. The single also features Academy Award-nominee Karen Black as backing vocals. The album was voted one of the 50 greatest albums of 2009 by Pitchfork Media. Music videos have been released for the songs "Dreams-Come-True-Girl", "You Saved My Life", and "The Executioner's Song".

Track listing 
 "Dreams-Come-True-Girl" – 5:20
 "Prima Donna" – 4:53
 "You Saved My Life" – 5:24
 "Don't Vote" – 5:26
 "The Executioner's Song" – 4:21
 "Harmonia" – 6:06
 "My Sister, My Spouse" – 5:14
 "Lionkiller Got Married" – 5:34
 "Eavesdropping on the Competition" – 3:53
 "Jonesy Boy" – 4:44
 "One Way to Go" – 2:55

Personnel
Cass McCombs (Artwork, Audio Production, Composer, Guitars, Harmonica, Piano, Synthesizer, Vocals)
Rob Barbato (Acoustic Guitar, Synthesizer, Tom-Tom, Vocals)
Will Canzoneri (Organ)
Greg Leisz (Pedal Steel Guitar)
Orpheo McCord (Percussion, Vocals)
Ariel Rechtschaid (Audio Engineer, Synthesizer)
Daniel Rukasin (Trombone)
Walker Teret (Bass, Piano, Vocals)
Luke Top (Acoustic Guitar)

Other Personnel 
 Gelett Burgess (Composer)
 Aaron Shugart Brown (Artwork)
 Karen Black (Featured Artist)
 Asha Schechter (Photography)
 Christopher Wilson (Photography)
 Dave Shultz (Mastering)

References

External links 
Cass McCombs (official site)

 Domino Records album release details

2009 albums
Domino Recording Company albums